Julian Knowle and Jürgen Melzer were the defending champions, but they lost to Marcelo Melo and Bruno Soares in the quarterfinal.
Eric Butorac and Jean-Julien Rojer won in the final 6–3, 6–2, against Andreas Seppi and Dmitry Tursunov.

Seeds

Draw

Draw

External links
 Doubles Draw

Rakuten Japan Open Tennis Championships - Men's Doubles